Assateague may refer to:

The Assateague people, a Native American tribe
Assateague Island, an Atlantic barrier island in Maryland and Virginia
Assateague Light, a lighthouse located on the southern end of Assateague Island
Assateague Island National Seashore, a unit of the National Park Service occupying much of Assateague Island 
USCGC Assateague, an Island-class cutter of the United States Coast Guard